China Beach is a beach on the west coast of Vancouver Island, British Columbia, Canada, southeast of the town of Port Renfrew.  The name is derived from the former name of Uglow Creek, formerly known as China Creek.  The beach was formerly the name of a provincial park, now rescinded.

See also
Sombrio Beach
Jordan River, British Columbia

References

Beaches of British Columbia
Juan de Fuca region
Surfing locations in Canada